Chen Jun or Jun Chen may refer to:

 Chen Jun (chemist) (陈军), Chinese chemist and academician of the Chinese Academy of Sciences
 Chen Jun (geographer), Chinese geographer and academician of the Chinese Academy of Engineering
 Chen Jun (geologist) (陈骏), Chinese geologist and academician of the Chinese Academy of Sciences
 Jun Chen (astronomer), Chinese-American astronomer